The men's 100 metre backstroke at the 2007 World Aquatics Championships took place on 26 March (heats and semifinals) and the evening of 27 March (final) at the Rod Laver Arena in Melbourne, Australia. 92 swimmers were entered in the event, of which 90 swam.

Existing records at the start of the event were:
World record (WR):  53.17, Aaron Peirsol (USA), 2 April 2005 in Indianapolis, IN, USA.
Championship record (CR): 53.61, Aaron Peirsol (USA), Barcelona 2003 (22 July 2003)

Results

Final

Semifinals

Heats

See also
Swimming at the 2008 Summer Olympics – Men's 100 metre backstroke

References

Swimming at the 2007 World Aquatics Championships